Blossom Time may refer to:
 Blossom Time (operetta), a 1921 English-language adaptation of the operetta Das Dreimäderlhaus
 Blossom Time (1934 film), a British musical drama film, based on the operetta Das Dreimäderlhaus
 Blossom Time (1940 film), a Swedish drama film

See also
 Das Dreimäderlhaus (disambiguation)
 Blossom Time at Ronnie Scott's, a 1966 live album by Blossom Dearie